Un corazón para dos ("A heart for two") is a 1990 Mexican film. It stars Pedro Fernández and Daniela Leites, directed by Sergio Véjar.

Plot

Bernardo is secretly in love with his friend Valeria, but has not gathered the courage to express his true feelings. When he learns that he does not have much time to live, must confront Valeria and let her know how he feels. When Bernardo learns about Valeria's heart condition he makes the heartbreaking decision to donate his heart to her to show his love.

Cast
 Pedro Fernández
 Daniela Leites
 Mario Almada
 José Elías Moreno
 Elsa Cárdenas
 Aurora Alonso
 Queta Lavat
 Carmelita González
 Chantal Andere
 Mariana Levy

References

External links
 

1990 films
1990 comedy-drama films
Mexican comedy-drama films
1990s Spanish-language films
1990s Mexican films